"Roads to Vegas" is the twenty-first episode of the eleventh season and the 209th overall episode of Family Guy. It follows Brian and Stewie as they head off to Vegas using a teleporting machine, which malfunctions and creates clones of themselves. The episode, which is the seventh in the series of Road to... episodes, originally aired on Fox in the United States on May 19, 2013, airing before the episode "No Country Club for Old Men". Together, the two episodes were promoted as being the season finale.

First announced at the 2012 San Diego Comic-Con International, the episode was written by Steve Callaghan and directed by Greg Colton. The episode generally received positive reviews from critics upon release. According to Nielsen ratings, it was viewed in 5.28 million homes in its original airing. The episode featured guest performances from Alexandra Breckenridge, Ralph Garman, Gary Janetti, Joe Lomonaco, Patrick Meighan, Emily Osment, Danny Smith, Alec Sulkin, and John Viener.

Plot
At the Quahog Gay Pride Day festivities, in a raffle sponsored by Weenie and the Butt, Brian wins tickets to see Celine Dion in Las Vegas. As they prepare to travel, Stewie convinces Brian to use the new teleportation device he has been working on instead. Stewie's device appears to have malfunctioned, and he believes it failed to work when it instead created a duplicate set of Brian and Stewie which was teleported to Vegas. The original Brian and Stewie then travel by plane to Vegas. As the duplicated pair check into the Bellagio hotel, their luck makes itself present immediately with the duplicated Brian winning a large jackpot at the slot machines near the entrance. The original Brian and Stewie arrive to find their room has been already taken. As the duplicated pair have the time of their lives, the original pair find themselves in a third-rate hotel. Trying their luck, they quickly lose all of the money they brought.

The original Brian is ready to go home but Stewie admits that he already gambled away their return tickets. Brian admits he cannot call for help after taking money from Lois. Using money they got from a loan shark, they bet on a basketball game and lose yet again. Preparing to leave, the duplicated pair sitting nearby accidentally takes the empty backpack from the unlucky pair. In contrast, the original Stewie unknowingly takes the duplicated pair's backpack, which is full of money.

As the pairs go their separate ways, an enforcer for the loan shark catches up with the duplicated pair (misidentifying the clones as the originals) to get the money back and they discover they have no cash. The enforcer orders Brian to decide whether he kills him or Stewie. Brian initially refuses to choose but when he panics, he tells the enforcer to shoot Stewie in the head, killing him, then the enforcer tells Brian to give him the money that he and Stewie borrowed or he dies next and leaves the room. Meanwhile, the original pair worries about getting caught. Stewie suggests that they make a run for it and head home, but Brian fears it will endanger the family. Stewie suggests that perhaps they should kill themselves and Brian reluctantly agrees. They prepare to throw themselves off the top balcony of the hotel but Stewie chickens out at the last second, leaving Brian to fall to his death. A panic-stricken Stewie trips over his backpack and finds the money the other pair had won.

Returning home the next day, the duplicated Brian and original Stewie bump into each other at the bus terminal. Stewie realizes that the device had made clones of themselves. After deceiving each other about how their respective friend's deaths transpired to spare each other's feelings, the unlucky Stewie, realizing that the money was the lucky Brian's, hides it away from him to stop him from getting greedy and allows himself to return Lois' stolen money to her. The two then return home while the duplicated Stewie and original Brian greet each other coldly at the pearly gates of Heaven.

Production and development

"Roads to Vegas" is the seventh episode of the series Road to.. hallmark which air through various seasons of the show. The episode was directed by Greg Colton, who previously directed the Road to ...  episodes "Road to Germany",  "Road to the Multiverse", and "Road to the North Pole". It was written by Family Guy veteran Steve Callaghan. "Roads to Vegas" is Callaghan's first writing credit for a Road to ...  episode.

In July 2012, the Family Guy panel first announced the episode at the San Diego Comic-Con International by giving a brief plot outline. The episode was revealed as the penultimate episode of the series eleventh season, airing before the premiere of "No Country Club for Old Men". Together, the two episodes were promoted as the season finale. On a press release, the Fox Network then officially announced the episode and described it as:
Stewie and Brian use Stewie's time machine to go to Las Vegas for a Bette Midler concert, but chaos ensues when the machine malfunctions and creates alt-versions of the pair: a "lucky" version and an "unlucky" one.

Production of the episode began months in advance according to the episode's writer Steve Callaghan. "We're working over a year ahead of time," Callaghan says in an interview with Hollywood.com. He added "We work so far ahead I can even tell you the finale... the finale is a cool episode called 'Roads to Vegas.' It's like a roadshow and Stewie and Brian teleport themselves to Las Vegas, but in the process [they] unknowingly create a duplicate of one another." In an interview with The Hollywood Reporter, Callaghan recalled the scene in the episode where Brian and Stewie consider joint suicide the most difficult scene for him to write in 2012.

In addition to the regular cast, "Roads to Vegas" featured guest performances from actress Alexandra Breckenridge, actor Ralph Garman, voice actor Joe Lomonaco, and actress and singer Emily Osment. Recurring voice actors and series writers Gary Janetti, Danny Smith, Alec Sulkin, and John Viener also made minor appearances throughout "Roads to Vegas".

Reception
During its original airing, the episode was viewed by a total of 5.28 million viewers according to Nielsen ratings. This made it the most viewed episode to premiere that night on Fox's Animation Domination, edging out two episodes of The Cleveland Show and two episodes of The Simpsons. The episode received a 2.6 rating in the 18–49 demographic.

The episode generally received positive reviews. Kevin McFarland of The A.V. Club gave the episode a B+ and said that it "isn't typically as heavy on the usual stock jokes that weigh the show down, and the adventures of Brian and Stewie drive more interest than most other characters." Carter Dotson of TV Fanatic gave the episode a 4.4 rating and called the episode and its sister episode, "No Country Club for Old Men", "a perfect representation of the wild extremes of this season." He added "it wasn't the funniest episode, but the way the parallel stories worked and intertwined was at least extremely interesting, lacking much of the lazy humor that at times plagued this season. Mark Trammell of TV Equals said "All in all, an okay episode that benefited from the combination approach, but MacFarlane might want to retire both the time travel stuff and the "road picture"-approach after this one, as the well is clearly running dry ... To tell the truth, I didn't laugh as much as I wanted to".

References

  The plot description was adapted from Roads to Vegas at Family Guy Wiki, which is available under a Creative Commons Attribution-Share Alike 3.0 license.

External links

 

2013 American television episodes
Television episodes about cloning
Family Guy (season 11) episodes
Television episodes set in Las Vegas
Road to... (Family Guy)